Kei Nishikori was the defending champion and successfully defended his title, defeating Ivo Karlović in the final, 6–4, 7–6(7–0).

Seeds
The top four seeds receive a bye into the second round.

Draw

Finals

Top half

Bottom half

Qualifying

Seeds

 David Goffin (qualified)
 Denis Kudla (qualified)
 Alex Kuznetsov (qualified)
 Víctor Estrella Burgos (qualifying competition)
 Rajeev Ram (qualified)
 Gastão Elias (qualifying competition)
 Bobby Reynolds (qualifying competition)
 James McGee (qualifying competition)

Qualifiers

Qualifying draw

First qualifier

Second qualifier

Third qualifier

Fourth qualifier

References
 Main Draw
 Qualifying Draw

2014 ATP World Tour
2014 Men's Singles